Caryocolum fibigerium is a moth of the family Gelechiidae. It is found in Portugal, Spain, France, Italy, Bulgaria, Greece and Morocco.

The length of the forewings is 4.5-5.5 mm for males and 4-5.5 mm for females. The forewings are blackish, mottled with dark brown. The dorsal margin is mid-brown, flecked with white. Adults have been recorded on wing in late April at lower altitudes and from July to early October in mountainous areas.

The larvae feed on Arenaria montana. Young larvae probably mine the leaves of their host plant, making a short linear mine. Older larvae live between two spun leaves. Larvae can be found from November to mid-December.

References

Moths described in 1988
fibigerium
Moths of Europe